The Nissan TB straight-six petrol engine was released in 1987 as the TB42.
Cubic capacity was  displacement). The engine was released with a two-barrel carburettor and a point type distributor. It was used in the Nissan Patrol Y60 and Y61 series.

Variants

TB42E and TB42S
In 1992 the TB42E emerged with electronic fuel injection and electronic ignition. At this time the TB42 was re-labeled as TB42S.
OHV
 @ 4200 rpm
 @ 3200 rpm

Nissan Patrol series Y60

TB45E and TB45S
In 1997 the TB45 was produced. It was available as TB45S (with carburettor and electronic ignition) or TB45E (with electronic fuel injection and electronic ignition).
OHV
 @ 4400 rpm
 @ 3600 rpm
Nissan Safari & Nissan Patrol series Y60 & Y61
OHV
 @ 4400 rpm
 @ 3600 rpm
Nissan Civilian & Isuzu Journey series W41

TB48DE
Shadowing the mainstream TB42/45 they were released as plain engines.
DOHC & Valve Timing Control
 @ 4800 rpm
 @ 3600 rpm
Nissan Safari & Nissan Patrol series Y61

See also
 List of Nissan engines

References

http://www.nissanlk.com/pdf/y61_catalog.pdf

TB
Straight-six engines
Gasoline engines by model